The Austin Sound are a women's American football team in the Extreme Football League (X League) based in Cedar Park, Texas, a suburb of Austin.

History
The Extreme Football League (X League) was announced in December 2019, as a successor to the Legends Football League (LFL). The announcement included the Sound, a successor to the LFL's Austin Acoustic. The X League's 2020 season was postponed, and the league also did not operate during 2021, amid the COVID-19 pandemic.

The Sound first competed during the 2022 X League season, defeating the Los Angeles Black Storm and losing to the Atlanta Empire during the regular season. The Sound advanced to the postseason, where they again lost to Atlanta, ending their season.

References

External links
 

Legends Football League US teams
American football teams in Austin, Texas
Women's sports in Texas
2022 establishments in Texas
American football teams established in 2022